Secular liberalism is a form of liberalism in which secularist principles and values, and sometimes non-religious ethics, are especially emphasised. It supports the separation of religion and state. Moreover, secular liberals are usually advocates of liberal democracy and the open society as models for organising stable and peaceful societies.

Secular liberalism stands at the other end of the political spectrum from religious authoritarianism, as seen in theocratic states and illiberal democracies. It is often associated with stances in favour of social equality and political freedom.

Description 
Being secularists by definition, secular liberals tends to favour secular states over theocracies or states with a state religion. Secular liberals advocate separation of church and state in the formal constitutional and legal sense. Secular liberal views typically see religious ideas about society, and religious arguments from authority drawn from various sacred texts, as having no special status, authority, or purchase in social, political, or ethical debates. It is common for secular liberals to advocate the teaching of religion as a historical and cultural phenomenon, and to oppose religious indoctrination or lessons which promote religion as fact in schools. Among those who have been labelled as secular liberals are prominent atheists like Richard Dawkins, Christopher Hitchens, Ayaan Hirsi Ali, and Sam Harris.

The label of "secular liberal" can sometimes be confusing as to what it refers to. While the term secular can sometimes be used as an adjective for atheists and non-religious people, chiefly in American usage, in British English it is more likely to refer to people who are secularists, which is to say, people who believe in keeping religion and government apart. The atheist writer Richard Dawkins can be categorised under both definitions, while the British Muslim liberal commentator Maajid Nawaz and liberal Christians who advocate secularism (such as Ed Davey, Tim Farron, and Barack Obama) only meet the latter. The Liberal Democrat party in the United Kingdom is secular liberal in philosophy, but its membership is made up of people from many religions and non-religious approaches.

In a modern democratic society, a plurality of conflicting doctrines share an uneasy co-existence within the framework of civilization.

Contemporary application

Arab Spring 
Secular liberalism is sometimes connected with the Arab Spring protests. One commentator labels it as a "secular liberal fantasy". Others have labeled the motivations behind it, and the temporary governments created as a result as secular liberalism.

Oftentimes, participation in the newly crowned democratic governments by the Muslim clerics are ignored in favor of the protesters' secular liberal ideas. Since 2011, more residents of the Middle East have been demanding a greater say in the running of their governments. They want democracy to appear in a uniquely Muslim fashion rather than through some artificial "secular" movement.

Criticism 
The Vatican and the Moscow Patriarchate are waging a common fight against secular liberalism; claiming that this idea violates the traditional Christian concepts of family and human values by exposing people to medico-biological experiments that are incompatible with their ideas of human dignity. The Primate of the Russian Orthodox Church expressed concern over trends in some Protestant communities towards secularizing, liberalizing and modernizing theology and Christian morals; he claims them to be products of secular liberalism.

The First Amendment of the United States Constitution, offering freedom of speech, has been criticized in a 2004 political manifesto by David Fergusson entitled Church, state and civil society.

See also 

 Age of Enlightenment
 Culture war
 Modernism
 Muscular liberalism
 Postchristianity
 Religious liberalism
 Secular ethics
 Secular humanism
 Secularism
 Secular state
 Secularity
 Secularization

References 

Liberalism
Economic systems
Political culture
Political ideologies
Political philosophy
Secularism
Secular humanism